The 2011 Zanesville, Ohio animal escape occurred on October 18, 2011, when the owner of Muskingum County Animal Farm released multiple exotic animals before committing suicide. 48 animals were subsequently killed by law enforcement.

Background

Muskingum County Animal Farm was a private zoo located in Zanesville, Ohio, United States. 

The animal farm had been repeatedly reported for inadequate and unsafe housing for the animals, as well as insufficient water and food. Neighbors had previously complained of animals escaping "improper fencing" and causing damage to neighboring property.

The escape
On October 18, 2011, owner Terry Thompson allegedly set free 50 of his 56 exotic animals before committing suicide by shooting himself in the head. Lions, tigers, bears and wolves were among the animals that escaped and were hunted by local law enforcement out of fear for public safety. 

Forty-eight animals were killed by the local police while two were presumed eaten by the other animals. The animals confirmed to be dead were eighteen bengal tigers, six black bears, two grizzly bears, two wolves, one macaque monkey, one baboon, three mountain lions, and seventeen african lions (nine males and eight females). Three leopards, a small grizzly bear, and two monkeys were left caged inside Thompson's home. These animals were tranquilized and sent to the Columbus Zoo. One of the surviving leopards was subsequently injured in an accident at the zoo and was euthanized.

Perpetrator

Terry Thompson, a Vietnam War veteran, was a lifelong collector of exotic animals. He had acted as an animal handler on Wild Kingdom in 2008, and provided a lion cub to a photoshoot with Heidi Klum. In the years leading up to his death, he went to prison on federal gun charges, was heavily in debt, and his wife had left him.

Reactions
Jack Hanna, TV wildlife expert and Director Emeritus of the Columbus Zoo, lamented the killings but deemed the police actions necessary. Ohio governor John Kasich called for a temporary moratorium on the sale of exotic animals.

In August 2012, Britain's Channel 4 broadcast a documentary on the animal release called America's Animal Hoarder: Horror at the Zoo, featuring footage of Thompson's animals and interviews with those who brought the situation under control.

The Netflix documentary Tiger King: Murder, Mayhem and Madness references the event in Episode 1 of Season 1. It includes footage of the escape and reactions from other private owners of exotic animals.

References

Further reading

2011 animal deaths
2011 disestablishments in Ohio
2011 in Ohio
2011 in the United States
October 2011 events in the United States
Animals shot dead by law enforcement officers in the United States
Animal deaths in Ohio
Animal welfare
Former zoos
Suicides by firearm in Ohio
Deaths by firearm in Ohio
Zoos in Ohio
Zoos disestablished in 2011
Zanesville, Ohio
Missing or escaped animals